Anthony Zizzo (August 3, 1935 – disappeared August 31, 2006), also known as "Little Tony" and "Little Toes", was an American mobster who was the underboss of the Chicago Outfit.

Early life

Carlisi Street Crew 

Zizzo was third in command of the Carlisi Street Crew.

In 1992, Zizzo and 10 other Carlisi Street Crew members were prosecuted by the Justice Department for racketeering.

Disappearance 

Zizzo disappeared after leaving his home on August 31, 2006, he was last seen outside a Melrose Park restaurant where his car was found after a missing person's report was made by his wife. He is presumed murdered, although the FBI is also considering the possibility he went into hiding.

Investigation
Theories on why Zizzo may have been targeted include fears he might testify against the Outfit as well as an ongoing feud with powerful captain Michael Sarno, whom he was supervising.

At the time of his disappearance, law enforcement believed Zizzo was the underboss of the Chicago Outfit as he was third in command in the 1990s. There is still a $10,000 reward in place for information leading authorities to Zizzo, dead or alive. The FBI considers Joseph Andriacchi a prime suspect in the disappearance of Zizzo. Other sources believe that Zizzo was murdered by Albert Vena, who was seen spending a lot of time with Zizzo including being sighted with Vena the night before his disappearance.

See also
List of people who disappeared

References

1930s births
2000s missing person cases
American gangsters of Italian descent
Chicago Outfit mobsters
Missing gangsters
Missing person cases in Illinois